The 7.5 cm KwK 37 L/24 (7.5 cm Kampfwagenkanone 37 L/24) was a short-barreled, howitzer-like German 75 mm tank gun used during World War II, primarily as the main armament of the early Panzer IV tank. Slightly modified as StuK 37, it was also mounted in early StuG III assault guns.

It was designed as a close-support infantry gun firing a high-explosive shell (hence the relatively short barrel) but was also effective against the tanks it faced early in the war. From March 1942, new variants of the Panzer IV and StuG III had a derivative of the 7.5 cm PaK 40 anti-tank gun, the longer-barreled 7.5 cm KwK 40. When older Panzer IVs were up-gunned, their former KwK 37 guns were reused to arm later Panzer III tanks and other infantry support vehicles. In 1943, depleted stocks and demand for the Panzer III Ausf. N required restarting production of a slightly revised 7.5 cm K 51 L/24 (7.5 cm Kanone 51 L/24).

Ammunition
KwK 37 used shell 75×243 mm. R 
 K.Gr.rot.Pz. - Armour Piercing Capped
 Kt. Kw. K. - Canister
 Nbgr. Kw. K. - Smoke
 Gr.38 Hl - High Explosive Anti-Tank
 Gr.38 Hl/A - High Explosive Anti-Tank
 Gr.38 Hl/B - High Explosive Anti-Tank
 Gr.38 Hl/C - High Explosive Anti-Tank

7.5 cm Sprgr.34 - High Explosive
 Projectile weight: 
 Explosive weight:  (1900 Kilojoules)

PzGr. 39/43 Armour-piercing
 Projectile weight: 
 Muzzle velocity:

Penetration comparison

Applications
 Neubaufahrzeug
 Panzer III Ausf. N
 Panzer IV Ausf. A to F1
 StuG III Ausf. A to E
 Sd.Kfz. 233 Schwerer Panzerspähwagen
 Sd.Kfz. 234/3 Schwerer Panzerspähwagen 
 Sd.Kfz. 250/8 Schützenpanzerwagen (7.5 cm KwK 37)
 Sd.Kfz. 251/9 Schützenpanzerwagen (7.5 cm KwK 37)

See also
 Howitzer Motor Carriage M8, armed with 75mm American M2 or M3 howitzer

Notes

External links

Tank guns of Germany
World War II artillery of Germany
75 mm artillery
World War II tank guns
Military equipment introduced in the 1930s